Gloucester High School is a high school in the Beacon Hill neighbourhood in the city of Ottawa, Ontario, Canada. Their mascot is the Gator, and the school can harbour approximately 1,600 students. As of 2019, they have roughly 1,000 students.

The school was founded in 1963 by the former Gloucester High School Board, and until 1969 was operated by the former Collegiate Institute Board of Ottawa.  In 1969 the Carleton Board of Education was formed, and Gloucester High School came under its ownership and management. Since the amalgamation of the Ottawa area English public school boards in 1998, it has operated under the jurisdiction of the Ottawa-Carleton District School Board. In 1970, James Hugh Burwell was appointed principal.

Curriculum
Gloucester High School provides education to grade 9 through 12; through a semestered curriculum as established by the Ontario Ministry of Education.

Clubs, organizations and groups include Gators for Ghana, ICU/AREE, Junior and Senior Band, Peer Action, Peer Mediation, an annual student-led Leadership Camp, Reach for the Top, GHS Radio, Fashion Club, school newspaper (the "Gator Gazette"), and the Gator Athletic Society. 2008-2009 was the first year Gloucester High School saw GTV, or Gator Television. With big-screen televisions in the lobby, Gators get many episodes weekly with sports updates and other school events. The school also has a well-supported group, The Link Crew, who help new Gators

Gloucester has many successful sports teams. Their cheerleading squad has won many awards, both the men's and women's senior soccer teams have participated at OFSAA in recent years and the Nordic Ski and Cross Country Running teams send many members to OFSAA annually. Other athletic teams include Gator Football, Gator Rugby, Senior and Junior basketball, wrestling, track and field, field hockey, volleyball, golf, and regular intramural sports during lunch. 2008-2009 marks the first men's Gator hockey team in several years.  In 2009, the Gloucester Field Hockey team won 1st place in the Tier 2 city championships. In the 2008/2009 Rugby Season, the Senior Rugby went undefeated and won the City Championship in Tier 2.

The 06/07 season was the first for the wrestling team in several years. The team had two wrestlers who qualified for OFSSA and nine players that made it to the city finals. The team participated in many other tournaments, all which they performed exceedingly well.

On October 25/06, the Gloucester men's football team won their first regular match game in two years.

Gloucester has had a successful track and field program in recent years, sending some students all the way up to OFSAA. In both 2015 and 2016, Gloucester has sent the same athlete to OFSAA to compete in javelin.

In 2010, Gloucester's Reach for the Top came 3rd in the regional competitions. They qualified for provincials and came first, thus qualifying for national. The team, coached by Andrew Jeacle, came 4th at the national finals.

Notable alumni
 Horst Bulau - Ski jumper who represented Canada in World Cup and Olympic competition.
 James Duthie - TSN Anchor
 Grace Lynn Kung - Actress, "Being Erica", "InSecurity"
 Aaron Ward - NHL player for the Boston Bruins, Anaheim Ducks and won two Stanley Cup rings with the Detroit Red Wings, retired.
 Norm Macdonald - comedian, former SNL news anchor
 Robert Bockstael - actor, writer, star of "North of 60"

See also
List of high schools in Ontario

References

External links
Gloucester High School Website
OCDSB Website
2012-2013 OCDSB School Profile
2006-2007 OCDSB School Profile
2005-2006 OCDSB School Profile
2004-2005 OCDSB School Profile
Alumni website

High schools in Ottawa
Educational institutions established in 1963
1963 establishments in Ontario